Edmond Canaple (19 November 1797 – 8 June 1876) was a French politician. He served as a member of the Corps législatif from 1855 to 1863.

References

1797 births
1876 deaths
Politicians from Marseille